Khalet al-Maiyya  خلة المية is a Palestinian village located nine kilometers south of Hebron and four kilometers west of Yatta. The village is in the Hebron Governorate Southern West Bank. According to the Palestinian Central Bureau of Statistics, the village had a population of 1,412 in 2007. The primary health care facilities for the village is designated by the Ministry of Health as level 2.

Footnotes

External links
  Kallet Al Maiyya Village (Fact Sheet), Applied Research Institute–Jerusalem, ARIJ
  Kallet Al Maiyya Village Profile, ARIJ
 Kallet Al Maiyya Village Area Photo, ARIJ
 The priorities and needs for development in Khallet al Maiyya village based on the community and local authorities’ assessment, ARIJ

Villages in the West Bank
Hebron Governorate
Municipalities of the State of Palestine